Charles Amadeus of Savoy, Duke of Nemours (12 April 162430 July 1652) was a French military leader and magnate. He was the father of the penultimate Duchess of Savoy and of a Queen of Portugal.

Biography
He was a son of Henri of Savoy, 3rd Duke of Nemours (1572-1632) and Anne of Lorraine. He was a younger brother of Louis of Savoy, who died in 1641.

Charles Amadeus served in the Army of Flanders in 1645, and in the following year commanded the light cavalry at the siege of Kortrijk. In 1652 he took part in the war of the Fronde, and fought at Bleneau and at the Faubourg St Antoine, where he was wounded.

On 11 July 1643 he married, at the Louvre, Élisabeth de Bourbon, Mademoiselle de Vendôme, the daughter of César, Duke of Vendôme, the legitimised son of King Henry IV of France by his mistress, Gabrielle d'Estrées. Her mother was the wealthy heiress, Françoise de Lorraine (1592–1669), the daughter of Philippe Emmanuel, Duke of Mercœur.

Charles Amadeus had several children: two daughters, three sons and a stillborn child of unrecorded gender. Only his two daughters survived him;
Marie Jeanne Baptiste of Savoy, Mademoiselle de Nemours (1644–1724), who married Charles Emmanuel II, Duke of Savoy, in 1665, and had issue;
Stillborn child
Marie Françoise Élisabeth of Savoy, Mademoiselle d'Aumale (1646–1683), who married king Alphonso VI of Portugal, in 1666 and afterwards Alphonso's younger brother, Pedro, Duke of Beja, regent of Portugal, and had issue.
Joseph of Savoy (1649–1649)
Francis of Savoy (1650–1650)
Charles Amadeus of Savoy (1651–1651)

Charles Amadeus was killed by his brother-in-law, François de Bourbon, Duke of Beaufort in a duel in 1652.  He was buried at the Notre Dame d'Annecy in Annecy, the capital of the  Genevois, of which the Dukes of Nemours were also counts.  Charles Amadeus' brother Henri, who had been archbishop of Reims, withdrew from orders in order to succeed him in the title of Duke of Nemours.

Ancestry

References

1624 births
Princes of Savoy
Italian nobility
1652 deaths
Dukes of Nemours
Counts of Geneva
Dukes of Aumale
Deaths by firearm in France
Duelling fatalities
Italian people of French descent
French people of Italian descent